WUFM (88.7 FM, "RadioU") is a non-commercial radio station licensed to Columbus, Ohio. The station retransmits its signal to several FM stations and FM translators nationwide including KRQZ, a full-service FM station licensed to Lompoc, California, WPRJ, a full-service FM station licensed to Coleman, Michigan, and KQXI, a full-service FM station licensed to Granite Falls, Washington.

RadioU primarily plays alternative and heavier style of Christian rock music across several genres, including pop-rock, hard rock, punk, and hip-hop, as well as electronic/dance, and hardcore/metal music. The station is accessible worldwide through its website  and can be seen through its music TV stream, RadioU TV.  RadioU is an example of how Christian Rock can reach a fan base much like the secular active rock and alternative rock formats.

RadioU TV
RadioU TV, formerly known as TVU, is a commercial-free, Christian rock television network which broadcasts through the Internet. It was formerly available on satellite and IPTV provider Sky Angel, and on the now-defunct Kids & Teens TV channel.

RadioU TV airs several shows, aside from its normal programming:
 Battery plays metalcore music videos from bands such as As I Lay Dying, Underoath, Norma Jean and Demon Hunter. Jared is the host.
 Radio U's Most Wanted (formerly TVU's Most Wanted, or TMW) is a countdown of the top videos of the week. Jared is the host.
 One Mil plays hip-hop artists such as KJ52, GRITS and Mars ILL.

RadioU TV is available for free in a 720p high-definition television format on the station's website. Standard-definition streams are also available in 360p and 480p. The online stream was originally limited to low-definition 240p in the ASX format, requiring a program such as Microsoft Silverlight, VLC media player or Windows Media Player.

In the past, RadioU TV (as TVU) was available as a standard-definition television channel on Sky Angel IPTV from 2007 to 2014, and on satellite from 2001 to 2008. TVU was also simulcast from 1 AM to 5 PM ET on the Kids & Teens TV (KTV) satellite station, which was available on Dish Network until January 31, 2019.

Ownership
RadioU is owned and operated by Spirit Communications, Inc., a non-profit organization funded by listener donations. RadioU does not have commercial sponsors and is kept running through listener donations received during its twice-yearly on-air fundraisers and through local events such as the RadioU Annual 5K.

Repeaters

Translators

Notes:

References

External links

UFM
UFM
Radio stations established in 1996